The 2005 IBF World Championships (World Badminton Championships) took place in Arrowhead Pond in Anaheim, United States, between August 15 and August 21, 2005. Following the results in the men's doubles.

Seeds
 Jens Eriksen / Martin Lundgaard Hansen, Quarter-final
 Candra Wijaya / Sigit Budiarto, Runners-up
 Fu Haifeng / Cai Yun, Third round
 Luluk Hadiyanto / Alvent Yulianto, Semi-final
 Lars Paaske / Jonas Rasmussen, Quarter-final
 Mathias Boe / Carsten Mogensen, Third round
 Jung Jae-sung / Lee Jae-jin, Quarter-final
 Chew Choon Eng / Choong Tan Fook, Third round
 Chan Chong Ming / Koo Kien Keat, Semi-final
 Flandy Limpele / Eng Hian, Quarter-final
 Thomas Laybourn / Peter Steffensen, Third round
 Mohd Fairuzizi Mohd Tazari / Lin Woon Fui, Third round
 Tony Gunawan / Howard Bach, Champions
 Tan Bin Shen / Ong Soon Hock, Third round
 Liu Kwok Wa / Albertus Susanto Njoto, Third round
 Michał Łogosz / Robert Mateusiak, Third round

Main stage

Section 1

Section 2

Section 3

Section 4

Final stage

External links 
2005 IBF-Results

- Mens Doubles, 2005 Ibf World Championships